Islam Akbaraliyevich Shamshiyev (born 1 March 1991) is a Kyrgyzstani footballer who plays as a midfielder for FC Alay

Career

Club
In January 2020, Shamshiyev joined Master 7 FC in Laos. He returned to Kyrgyzstan in March 2020, joining FC Kaganat.

After a spell at Neftchi, Shamshiyev moved to FC Alay in the summer 2021.

International
Shamshiyev is a member of the Kyrgyzstan national football team.

Shamshiyev missed the 2019 AFC Asian Cup due to a knee injury that required surgery.

Career statistics

International

Statistics accurate as of match played 29 May 2018

International goals
Scores and results list Kyrgyzstan's goal tally first.

References

External links

1991 births
Living people
Kyrgyzstan international footballers
Kyrgyzstani footballers
Kyrgyzstani expatriate footballers
FC Dordoi Bishkek players
FC Alay players
Master 7 FC players
Kyrgyz Premier League players
Association football midfielders
Expatriate footballers in Laos